In the densely populated Hong Kong, waste is a complex issue. The territory generates around 6.4 million tons of waste each year but is able to collect and process only a minimal portion of recyclable waste. By 2019, its existing landfills are expected to be full. The government has introduced waste management schemes and is working to educate the public on the subject. On the commercial side, producers are taking up measures to reduce waste.

Statistics
Hong Kong EPD (Environmental Protection Department) provides data and statistics about waste management.

Waste management process

In Hong Kong, wastes generated can be categorised as municipal solid waste, construction and demolition waste, chemical waste and other special waste, including: clinical waste, animal carcasses, livestock waste, radioactive waste, grease trap waste and waterworks/sewage sludges. According to a 2016 report from Waste Atlas, waste generation in Hong Kong is around 6.4 million tonnes per year or 900 kg/cap/year.  

Wastes in Hong Kong are first collected from disposal bins to refuse transfer stations (RTS). After they are compacted and put in containers, they are delivered to disposal lands or recycling centers.

There are hundreds of collectors in the territory where wastes are located before transferring to refuse transfer stations. There are seven refuse transfer stations in the territory. They serve as centralised collection points for the transfer of waste to the strategic landfills.

Landfills
Operated by the EPD, the landfill sites only accept garbage from Hong Kong. Thirteen of 16 landfills were closed from 1988 to 1996. Starting from 6 January 2016, the South East New Territories Landfill (SENT) will only receive construction waste. Hong Kong has three strategic landfills in use. All are located in the New Territories:

Closed landfills
There are also 13 closed landfills. The closed landfills are converted into facilities such as golf courses, multi-purpose grass pitches, rest gardens, and ecological parks. Greenhouse gases emitted from closed landfills are used for energy. The closed landfills are:

Management of emissions from waste 
The degradation of the organic components contained within waste generates both gaseous and liquid emissions. Landfill gas, principally methane and carbon dioxide, is formed once anaerobic conditions are achieved within the landfill, and leachate is formed as liquids percolate through landfilled waste and pick up a cocktail of toxic and contaminating elements from the multiple waste fractions that comprise Municipal Solid Waste. Both can be harmful to human health and toxic to the environment. Landfill gas is an important source of greenhouse gases that has been clearly shown to contribute to global warming, whilst leachate can be an important source of local contamination, especially to waterways. As Hong Kong is very close to the sea as well as to heavily built up areas, the control of emissions is of high importance. Wherever possible, landfill gas is used as a fuel for the generation of power and, in Hong Kong, landfill gas is used to generate electricity and to provide power for the treatment of leachate produced from the landfilled waste.

The technology used for landfill gas management is well known throughout the world and includes on-site power generation, provision of heat for leachate treatment and off-site use as a source of natural biogas for feeding into the gas main. Leachate is treated using landfill gas to provide heat for reducing the heavy loading of ammonia and ensuring that it can be released into the environment according to strict criteria as specified by the Environmental Protection Department of Hong Kong, and the process is employed at all three strategic landfill sites cited above.

NGO campaigns

Friends of the Earth
Friends of the Earth (HK) is one of the local environmental groups in Hong Kong. One of its campaigns emphasises on setting up an all-inclusive recycling system.

Green Power
Green Power, another local environmental organisation, has many activities related to waste control and management. Green Power organises an ongoing "Zero Waste Action", aiming to reduce the waste the territory produces.

See also
 Air pollution in Hong Kong
 Domestic waste management in Hong Kong
 Environment of Hong Kong
 Sha Tin Sewage Treatment Works

References

Further reading

External links

 Restoring Hong Kong's Landfills
 Hong Kong Environmental Protection Department
 The Struggle for Sustainable Waste Management in Hong Kong: 1950s–2010s